Mega Man IV is an action-platform video game by Capcom for the Nintendo Game Boy. It is the fourth installment in the handheld version of the Mega Man series. The game continues the quest of the protagonist Mega Man in the struggle with his long-time nemesis Dr. Wily, who sends out a disruptive radio signal to cause a rampage, citywide destruction from dormant robots. Mega Man IV features the traditional action platforming gameplay of the prior games while introducing one new feature, the ability to purchase items with power-ups found throughout each stage. As with previous Game Boy releases, the game incorporates gameplay elements and bosses from two sequential Nintendo Entertainment System (NES) games: Mega Man 4 and Mega Man 5. The game has received a warm critical reception. In 2013, Mega Man IV was made available on the Virtual Console of Japan's Nintendo eShop for the Nintendo 3DS. It was later released in the North American and PAL region eShops the following year.

Plot
The plot of the game once again involves the protagonist Mega Man trying to thwart the world domination plans of the infamous Dr. Wily. On a seemingly peaceful day in a large city, Wily appears in the sky in his flying saucer and sends out a radio transmission that causes all the robots at the annual Robot Master Exposition to go on a rampage. He then sends eight new rebuilt robots of his own to different parts of the city to lead the destruction. Having resisted this reprogramming signal, Mega Man responds by defeating all four of these previous foes in battle and chases Wily to a large tank. Inside the tank, the hero encounters Ballade, yet another robot specially designed to kill him. Mega Man defeats this new enemy, pursues the remaining enemies in the city, and returns to the tank. There, he has a victorious rematch with Ballade, only to see Wily quickly retreat to his space station. Dr. Light fits Mega Man's companion Rush with a space flight ability, allowing the hero to lead a one-man assault on Wily's new stronghold. Mega Man beats Wily, but is unable to blast his way out of the exploding space station. At the last moment, Ballade arrives and self-destructs in repentance, creating a hole through which Mega Man can safely escape.

Gameplay
At its core, the gameplay is still the same as the previous 3 Mega Man Game Boy games. The player takes on the role of Mega Man as he traverses a series of two sets of selectable action/platforming stages in any order desired. The player's initial weapon, the "Mega Buster", can fire both small shots and much larger and more powerful, charged blasts. Each stage is populated with various types of enemy robots and a single Robot Master exclusive boss. Beating the Robot Master will earn the player its special "Master Weapon" for use throughout the rest of the game. Clearing 2 of the Robot stages also gives the player access to abilities from Mega Man's dog Rush, who can transform into a springboard for reaching high platforms or a jet for crossing large distances. Also, the game's first four Robot stages each house a letter ("B-E-A-T") that spell out the name of the bird Beat. Collecting all 4 letters endows the player the ability to summon upon Beat to assist by attacking enemies. On the other hand, the game's latter four Robot stages each house letters that spell ("W-I-L-Y") which would be imperative to collect in entering to the first part of Dr. Wily's fortress. The stages also contain hidden passages where the character Proto Man leaves the player items, often giving "Super Tanks" that refill all weapons energy and health energy.

Mega Man IV carries on the Game Boy line's tradition of recycling elements from two consecutive Mega Man NES releases, most prominently with its bosses. The first four Robot Masters (Toad Man, Bright Man, Pharaoh Man, and Ring Man) are originally from Mega Man 4 and the latter four (Crystal Man, Napalm Man, Stone Man, and Charge Man) are from Mega Man 5. Mega Man IV also introduces a shop feature to the series. In addition to various restorative items like health, weapon power, extra lives, energy tanks that can be stored for later use, the player can pick up "Power Chips (P-Chips)" dropped by enemies or in designated spots in the stages. Dr. Light's lab can also be visited from the stage select screen, wherein the player can purchase various items using the P-Chips collected. One such item is the newly introduced "Auto Charger" (or "Energy Balancer", which was originally conceived for Mega Man 5 but removed), which automatically takes weapon energy capsules and restores it in the weapon with the least amount of energy left, provided that there is no refillable special weapon selected.

Also, for the first time in the Mega Man Game Boy series, the Robot Master re-match sequence (where Mega Man must fight all 8 Robot Masters again in a teleportation hatch in Dr. Wily's castle) is implemented, as opposed to the previous three Mega Man Game Boy titles, where Mega Man fought Wily straight on after going through the castle.

Development
Using features from two previous NES titles, as well as some new elements, series artist Keiji Inafune was happy with the flow from Mega Man III to Mega Man IV. Inafune was also satisfied with how the Mega Man Killers Enker, Punk, and Ballade turned out. The artist had fun thinking up new ideas for Ballade's second form, which included the horns on his head turning up, larger bombs, and shades covering his eyes.

Reception and legacy

Mega Man IV has been well-received critically. Major gaming magazines Nintendo Power and Game Players have called the graphics and gameplay "exceptional" and "terrific", although the former was disappointed by its few surprises. Electronic Gaming Monthly described Mega Man IV as one of the best Game Boy games to date, due to its near flawless recreation of the action and technique of the home console games and graphics which push the Game Boy hardware "to its limits and then some" (though they did complain of screen blurring). They also praised the music and the extremely long, challenging levels.

Mega Man IV was re-released on April 13, 2001 for the Nintendo Power cartridge service in Japan alongside its four Game Boy counterparts. The 5 games that comprise this subseries were to be released on a Game Boy Advance compilation in 2004, but was cancelled. The boss Ballade would later appear as part of a downloadable content stage for Mega Man 10 in 2010. On July 18, 2013, it was confirmed that Mega Man IV is planned for release on the 3DS Virtual Console which came out on October 23, 2013 in Japan and on May 15, 2014 in North America. Nintendo Power rated Mega Man IV the second best Game Boy game of 1993.

References

External links

Official Rockman website 

1993 video games
Game Boy games
Platform games
Mega Man games
Side-scrolling video games
Action video games
Video games developed in Japan
Virtual Console games
Superhero video games
Mega Man spin-off games
Video games set in outer space
Virtual Console games for Nintendo 3DS